Itogi Nauki i Techniki (Итоги науки и техники, Review of Science and Technique, established 1972 in Moscow) is a Russian journal, publishing several series for a variety of areas in science and technology, including mathematics, biology, astronomy, and motor vehicles.

Notes

Science and technology in Russia
Science and technology magazines published in Russia
Magazines established in 1972
Magazines published in Moscow